Rollandia  is a small genus of birds in the grebe family. Its two members are found in South America.

Species
They are:

References

ITIS

 
Bird genera
Taxa named by Charles Lucien Bonaparte